A barracoon (a corruption of Portuguese barracão, an augmentative form of the Catalan loanword barraca ('hut') through Spanish barracón) is a type of barracks used historically for the internment of enslaved or criminals. 

In the Atlantic slave trade, captured individuals were temporarily transported to and held at barracoons along the coast of West Africa, where they awaited transportation across the Atlantic Ocean. A barracoon simplified the slave trader's job of keeping the prospective slaves alive and in captivity, with the barracks being closely guarded and the captives being fed and allowed exercise.

The barracoons varied in size and design, from small enclosures adjacent to the businesses of European traders to larger protected buildings. The amount of time enslaved persons spent inside a barracoon depended primarily on two factors: their health and the availability of slave ships. Many captive enslaved individuals died in barracoons, some as a consequence of the hardships they experienced on their journeys and some as a result of their exposure to lethal European diseases (to which they had little immunity).

See also
 Barracoon: The Story of the Last "Black Cargo", a non-fiction work by Zora Neale Hurston based on her interviews in 1927 with Cudjoe Lewis
 Seasoning (slavery)
 Signare
 Atlantic Creole
 House of Slaves

References

African slave trade
Imprisonment and detention
Barracks
Slave cabins and quarters